The Seale Baronetcy, of Mount Boone in the County of Devon, is a title in the Baronetage of the United Kingdom. It was created on 31 July 1838 for John Henry Seale, Whig Member of Parliament for Dartmouth from 1832 to 1844. The second Baronet was sixteen times Mayor of Dartmouth.

The family descended from John Seale (born c.1512) of St Brelade in Jersey, a descendant of Robert Seale (or Scelle) a gens de bien of St Brelade 1292. In 1720 the 1st Baronet's grandfather John Seale, purchased the estate of Mount Boone near Dartmouth. The latter's great-grandfather was John Seale, Constable of St Brelade 1644–51, the son of John Seale, Constable of St Brelade 1615–21.

Seale baronets, of Mount Boone (1838)
Sir John Henry Seale, 1st Baronet (1780–1844)
Sir Henry Paul Seale, 2nd Baronet (1806–1897)
Sir John Henry Seale, 3rd Baronet (1843–1914)
Sir John Carteret Hyde Seale, 4th Baronet (1881–1964)
Sir John Henry Seale, 5th Baronet (1921–2017)
Sir (John) Robert Charters Seale, 6th Baronet (born 1954)

Notes

References
Kidd, Charles, Williamson, David (editors). Debrett's Peerage and Baronetage (1990 edition). New York: St Martin's Press, 1990, 

Baronetcies in the Baronetage of the United Kingdom